Vyacheslav Solovyov (or Soloviev) may refer to the following Russian people:
Vyacheslav Solovyov (footballer) (1925–1996)
Vyacheslav Solovyov (serial killer) (1970–2008)